The Plattner Story and Others is a collection of seventeen short stories written by H. G. Wells.  This volume was first published in March 1897 by Methuen & Co.

Stories collected 
"The Plattner Story" (New Review, April 1896)
"The Argonauts of the Air" (Phil May's Annual, December 1895)
"The Story of the Late Mr. Elvesham" (The Idler, May 1896)
"In the Abyss" (Pearson's Magazine, August 1896)
"The Apple" (The Idler, October 1896)
"Under the Knife" (The New Review, January 1896)
"The Sea Raiders" (The Weekly Sun Literary Supplement, December 1896)
"Pollock and the Porroh Man" (New Budget, May 1895)
"The Red Room" (The Idler, March 1896)
"The Cone" (Unicorn, 1895)
"The Purple Pileus" (Black and White, Christmas Number 1896)
"The Jilting of Jane" (first published in this collection)
"In the Modern Vein" (first published as "A Bardlet's Romance", Truth, March 1894)
"A Catastrophe" (New Budget, April 1895)
"The Lost Inheritance" (first published in this collection)
"The Sad Story of a Dramatic Critic" (New Budget, August 1895)
"A Slip Under the Microscope" (The Yellow Book, January 1896)

See also
 H. G. Wells bibliography

References

External links

 
 
 

1897 short story collections
Short story collections by H. G. Wells